Beat the Reaper is a 2009 crime novel, the debut novel of author/physician Josh Bazell.

Plot
The plot, written in first-person and alternating between present-day scenes and flashbacks, concerns Peter Brown, a medical resident in the Federal Witness Protection Program.

In the flashback chapters Brown narrates how, under his real name of Pietro Brnwa, he fell in with a Mafia family and became a hitman after avenging the deaths of his grandparents who had survived the Nazi death camp Auschwitz. In the present, Brown must help save the life of a mobster who knew him as Brnwa, lest the patient reveal Brnwa/Brown's location to the local crime boss.

Film 
New Regency Productions has acquired film rights to the novel with an eye toward Leonardo DiCaprio as co-producer and Sebastian Stan as lead actor.

References

External links
Beat the Reaper review from The Washington Post
Beat the Reaper review from Bloomberg L.P.
Beat the Reaper review from The Guardian
"Leonardo DiCaprio Aims To 'Beat The Reaper' With Mob Adventure" from MTV Movie News
"DiCaprio set to 'Beat the Reaper'" from Variety

American crime novels
2009 American novels
2009 debut novels
Nonlinear narrative novels